Chagari is a rural locality (a khutor) in Lizinovskoye Rural Settlement, Rossoshansky District, Voronezh Oblast, Russia. The population was 210 as of 2010. There are 3 streets.

Geography 
Chagari is located 23 km southwest of Rossosh (the district's administrative centre) by road. Lizinovka is the nearest rural locality.

References 

Rural localities in Rossoshansky District